Bulgaristan may refer to:

 Previous name for Tatarstan, a federal republic in Russia.
 The Turkish and Persian name for Bulgaria.